Spruce Grove is a city in Alberta, Canada.

Spruce Grove may also refer to:

Canada
Edmonton—Spruce Grove, federal electoral district in Alberta
Spruce Grove-Sturgeon-St. Albert, provincial electoral district in Alberta

United States
Spruce Grove, California, former name of Harris, California
Spruce Grove Township, Becker County, Minnesota, township in Minnesota
Spruce Grove Township, Beltrami County, Minnesota, township in Minnesota